Aleš Píša (born 2 January 1977) is a Czech former professional ice hockey defenceman. He played 53 games in the National Hockey League with the Edmonton Oilers and New York Rangers during the 2001–02 and 2002–03 seasons. The rest of his career, which lasted from 1993 to 2018, was mainly spent in the Czech Extraliga. He was chosen as an over-age selection in the ninth round of the 2001 NHL Entry Draft, 272nd overall, by the Edmonton Oilers.

Playing career
After spending most of his professional career with his hometown team of Pardubice, Píša made his North America debut with the Hamilton Bulldogs of the American Hockey League (AHL) in 2001. He saw spot duty with the Oilers his first year, playing in only two games, but the following season, he remained with the Oilers until the trade deadline. At the deadline, Píša was shipped to the New York Rangers as part of a package that brought back Radek Dvořák.

Píša played just three games for the Rangers to finish the year, and signed with Severstal Cherepovets of the Russian Superleague (RSL) in 2003–04, a team he remained with throughout the 2004–05 NHL lockout.

Píša played the 2005–06 season with Khimik Moscow Oblast of the RSL, and was one of the team's top players, leading all Mytishi Khimik defenceman in points.

Career statistics

Regular season and playoffs

International

Transactions
24 June 2001 — Drafted by the Edmonton Oilers in the ninth round, 272nd overall.
11 March 2003 — Traded with Anson Carter to the New York Rangers in exchange for Radek Dvořák and Cory Cross.

External links

 

1977 births
Living people
Atlant Moscow Oblast players
Czech ice hockey defencemen
Edmonton Oilers draft picks
Edmonton Oilers players
Czech expatriate ice hockey players in Russia
Hamilton Bulldogs (AHL) players
HC Dynamo Pardubice players
New York Rangers players
Sportspeople from Pardubice
Severstal Cherepovets players
Torpedo Nizhny Novgorod players
Czech expatriate ice hockey players in Canada
Czech expatriate ice hockey players in the United States